Amata xanthura, the southern spotted tiger moth, is a species of moth of the family Erebidae. It was first described by Alfred Jefferis Turner in 1905. It is found in Australia, where it has been recorded from the Northern Territory, New South Wales and Victoria.

References 

Xanthura
Moths of Australia
Moths described in 1905